Pattanaje is a 2017 Indian Tulu language film  directed and Produced by Thonse Vijay Kumar Shetty, under the banner of KalaJagattu Creations. The film stars Shivadhwaj, Surya Rao, Reshma Shetty and Kaajal Kunder in main roles. Senior actors Chethan Rai, Mani, Sundar Rai, Mandara, Praveen Markame and Sita Kote also acted in the movie.

Plot 
In the film, the heroine is born on “Pattanaje” day. The story revolves around the sudden developments in her life. It also focuses on discrimination, atrocities and social issues. It shows how the heroine deals with them with the help of the rich cultural background of the region.

Cast 
 
 Shivadhwaj
 Surya Rao
 Kaajal Kunder
 Prateek Shetty 
 Reshma Shetty
 Chethan Rai, Mani
 Sundar Rai, Mandar
 Praveen Markame

Production 
The film is produced by Kala Jagattu Creations and shot around Mangalore and Udupi.

Music 
Audio launch function of movie held at London during the Tulu Community UK's annual get together event.  V. Manohar has composed the music. Sunita Shetty, Bhaskar Rai Kukkuvalli, Navneet Shetty Kadri and Dinakar Pachanadi have written the lyrics.

Release 
The film was released on 1 September 2017.

References

External links